The Gran Premio Polla de Potrillos is a Group 1 flat horse race in Argentina open to three-year-old colts run over a distance of  at Hipódromo Argentino de Palermo. It is the first race in the Argentinian Triple Crown, and equivalent to the English 2000 Guineas Stakes. It is considered one of the principle races in defining the champion three-year-old colt, and generally occurs in September, near the beginning of a horse's three-year-old season.

History 
The Gran Premio Polla de Potrillos was first run in 1895, and has been run every year since then. Since its inauguration, its distance, surface, and location have not changed. In 1966, champion racehorse Forli won the race by 17 lengths in record time of 1:33 2/5. Due to the less accurate clocks of the time that only measured to a fifth of a second, this time may or may not be equivalent to the current speed record of 1:33.20.

Since 2016, the race has been run in conjunction with the Horse Parade art show, to promote the arts and raise money for non-profit organizations.

Records (since 1988) 
Speed record:

 1:32.30 – American Tattoo (2018)
 1:33.20 – Interprete (1991)

Largest margin of victory:

 9 lengths – Refinado Tom (1996)

Most wins by a jockey:

 4 – Pablo Gustavo Falero (2001, 2003, 2005, 2016)

Most wins by a trainer:

 6 – Juan Carlos H. Etchechoury (1992, 1993, 1995, 1999, 2002, 2017)

Most wins by an owner:

 2 – Haras La Biznaga (1993, 1996)
 2 – Haras de la Pomme (1995, 1999)
 2 – Haras Las Telas (1997, 1998)
 2 – Ana Ruth (2005, 2006)

Winners since 1988

Earlier Winners 

 1895: Tom Pouce
 1896: Talma
 1897: Balcarce
 1898: Honor
 1899: Dictador II
 1900: Triboulet
 1901: Porrazo
 1902: Pippermint
 1903: Roderick Dhu
 1904: Old Man
 1905: Pelayo
 1906: Melgarejo
 1907: Basalto
 1908: Chopp
 1909: Baratiere
 1910: Larrea
 1911: Saint Marceaux
 1912: Inspector
 1913: Duc de Maine
 1914: Kick II
 1915: Picacero
 1916: Vadarkblar
 1917: Botafogo
 1918: Caricato
 1919: Buen Ojo
 1920: Lepanto
 1921: Pulgain
 1922: Rico
 1923: Ordenaza
 1924: Capablancea
 1925: Macon
 1926: Gold Seeker
 1927: Congreve
 1928: Hechicero
 1929: Tresiete
 1930: Schopenhauer
 1931: Mineral
 1932: Correlo
 1934: Silfo
 1935: Rebaño
 1936: Médicis
 1937: Vino Puro
 1938: Sorteado
 1939: Embrujo
 1940: Zurrún
 1941: Gay Boy
 1942: Halcón
 1943: Black Out
 1944: Adén
 1945: Estuardo
 1946: Remo
 1947: Nigromante
 1948: Quetzalcoatl
 1949: Pancho Freddy
 1950: Mirontón
 1951: Yatasto
 1952: Buscapié
 1953: Profundo
 1954: Dorón
 1955: Tatán
 1956: Solito
 1957: Carapálida
 1958: Manantial
 1959: Panair
 1960: Cachetero & Fiumé
 1961: Nápoles
 1962: Ukase
 1963: Trousseau
 1964: Gobernado
 1965: Laconique
 1966: Forli
 1967: Gran Atleta
 1968: Frescor
 1969: Martinet
 1970: Cipol
 1971: Tropical Sun
 1972: Mucho Sol
 1973: Mariache
 1974: Telefónico
 1975: Ivanhoe III
 1976: Paris
 1977: Cipayo
 1978: Telescópico
 1979: Fabiolo
 1980: Mountdrago
 1981: Chirlazo
 1982: Pinturicchio
 1983: El Asesor
 1984: Just In Case
 1985: Sings
 1986: El Serrano
 1987: Pranke

References 

Argentina Jockey Club Race Results

Horse races in Argentina
Flat horse races for three-year-olds
Graded stakes races